Emily Clark Huntington Miller (October 22, 1833 – November 2, 1913) was an American author, editor, poet, and educator who co-founded St. Nicholas Magazine, a publication for children. Earlier in her career, she served as the Assistant Editor of The Little Corporal, a children's magazine and Associate Editor of the Ladies' Home Journal. Miller and Jennie Fowler Willing were involved with organizing a convention in Cleveland in 1874, at which the National Woman's Christian Temperance Union was formed. In September 1891, Miller was appointed Dean of Women at Northwestern University in Illinois.

Early years
Emily Clark Huntington was born in Brooklyn, Connecticut, October 22, 1833, the daughter of Methodist pastor Thomas Huntington and Paulina Clark. She received a liberal education and was graduated from Oberlin College, Oberlin, Ohio in 1857.

Career

Miller showed her literary ability in her school-days. While yet a girl, she published a number of sketches and stories, which attracted general attention. Thereafter, she was a constant and prolific contributor of sketches, short stories, serials, poems and miscellaneous articles to newspapers and magazines. She earned a reputation by her work on The Little Corporal. She gave much time and work to Sunday-school and missionary interests. She was connected with the Chautauqua Literary and Scientific Circle from its commencement, and served as president of the Chautauqua Woman's Club for four years. She was appointed Dean of Women at Northwestern University, in Evanston, Illinois, where she subsequently resided. Her published literary work included 15 volumes, some of which were republished in England, and all of which found wide circles of readers. Her poetical productions were  numerous. Over 100 of her poems were set to music, including her 1865 poem Lilly's Secret, which became the basis for the lyrics to the popular Christmas song Jolly Old Saint Nicholas. In her varied career, she was equally successful as writer, educator, temperance-worker, and journalist.

Besides her literary work, Miller prepared and gave  lectures on temperance, also on missionary and educational subjects. She was prominently connected with the Woman's Foreign Missionary Society of the Methodist Episcopal Church, and was a Trustee of  Northwestern University at Evanston, Illinois.

Personal life
In 1860, she married John E. Miller. Of their children, three sons survived, including George A. Miller; their only daughter died in infancy. Mr. and Mrs. Miller moved from Evanston, Illinois, to St. Paul, Minnesota, where the husband died in 1882.

Selected works

Author
“Kirkwood series”
“Little Neighbors”
"Captain Fritz”
“Fighting the enemy”
“Highway and Hedges”

Popular music (lyrics only)
My Good for Nothing 
Jolly Old Saint Nicholas

Hymns (lyrics only) 
Beyond the Dark River of Death
Blessed Are the Children
Easter Hymn
Enter Thy Temple, Glorious King
Father, While the Shadows Fall
Hark, the Chorus Swelling
I Love the Name of Jesus
I Love to Hear the Story
O, Land of the Blessed!
O, Realm of Light
Stay, Trembling Soul, and Do Not Fear
Tell the blessed Tidings
Work and Never Weary
Baby's first Christmas

References

Attribution

External links 
 
 
 http://www.library.northwestern.edu/archives/onthisday/2008/09/sept_1891_mrs_emily_huntington.html
 http://www.novelguide.com/a/discover/aww_03/aww_03_00823.html

1833 births
1913 deaths
19th-century American poets
19th-century American women writers
20th-century American poets
20th-century American women writers
American Christian hymnwriters
People from Windham County, Connecticut
Poets from Connecticut
Oberlin College alumni
Northwestern University faculty
Songwriters from Connecticut
American women hymnwriters
Woman's Christian Temperance Union people
American women non-fiction writers
20th-century American non-fiction writers
Wikipedia articles incorporating text from A Woman of the Century
American women academics
19th-century American women musicians